(Her Highness the Dancer) is a 1922 German silent film directed by Richard Eichberg and featuring Bela Lugosi.

The film was originally banned by the Film Review Office for quite some time: it was not permitted to be shown in the Weimar Republic. The filmmakers appealed, but the Office considered the film "corruptive" and the appeal was rejected A shortened version was again not approved. Finally on 16 January 1923 a version of the film, now retitled  (The Ordeal of Eva Grunwald) was approved, considered suitable for adults only. This approved version consisted of five acts and totaled 1,887 meters of film, compared to the original's six acts and 1,995 meters.

Lugosi left Germany for the United States in October, 1920, so if he was indeed in this film, it had to have been filmed in 1920, but most sources list it as a 1922 film, probably because it took so long for the film to be approved by the German censors.

Cast
 Lee Parry as Eva Grunwald
 Eduard Rothauser as Herrmann Grunwald, glockner of St Mary's
 Aruth Wartan as Gadvan
 Syme Delmar as Ruth Irving
 Rudolf Zolling as Organist of St Mary's
  as Wolfgang Tautlingen
 Walter Steinbeck as Lord Cecil Gloster
 Paul Ludwig as Coppers, Lord Cecil's secretary
 Robert Scholz
 Violetta Napierska
 Bela Lugosi
 Chief Tahachee as German Man (uncredited)

See also
 Béla Lugosi filmography

Notes and references

External links

1922 films
German black-and-white films
German silent feature films
Films of the Weimar Republic
Films directed by Richard Eichberg
1920s German films